Elm Farm is a modern housing estate Built in the 1970s and was built in Aylesbury, Buckinghamshire, England and one of the last new estates to be built within the parish boundary of Aylesbury.(where the 2011 Census population was included) Elm Farm also has a circular walk. Called the Round Elm Farm walk. This walk is mainly for local residents can do dog walking and a have nice 1.1 mile trip. 

It has its own football team called Elm Farm FC and in the political geography of the town it now forms a ward with Mandeville.

Education 
William Harding Combined School is a mixed primary school in Elm Farm.

It is a community school, which takes children from the age of 4 through to the age of 11. The school has approximately 700 pupils.

The school is named after William Harding of Walton.

Amenities 
There are a number of local businesses on Elm Farm Road serving the community: Renee's Food and Wine, Elm Farm Tandoori, Elm Farm Barbers, The Oaks bookshop, Hampden Vets and Elm Farm Ladies Hair.

Sport and leisure facilities are available a short distance from Elm Farm, via the pedestrian/cycle route under the railway bridge close to William Harding School, at the Stoke Mandeville Stadium.

Transport
Bus route 7 provides links to Aylesbury Bus station,Broughton and Bedgrove. This service is operated by Red Rose Travel by Red Rose Travel  
 

White Route 50 provides links to Aylesbury bus station,stoke Mandeville and Wendover this service is operated by red Rose travel

References 
7 Buscountycouncil.weebly.com  

Aylesbury